The Netherlands women's national artistic gymnastics team represents the Netherlands in FIG international competitions.

History
The Netherlands has participated in the Olympic Games women's team competition seven times. It has won one team medal, a gold in 1928.

Senior roster

Team competition results

Olympic Games
 1928 —  gold medal
Estella Agsteribbe, Jacomina van den Berg, Alida van den Bos, Petronella Burgerhof, Elka de Levie, Helena Nordheim, Ans Polak, Petronella van Randwijk, Hendrika van Rumt, Jud Simons, Jacoba Stelma, Anna van der Vegt
 1936 — did not participate
 1948 — 5th place
Cootje van Kampen-Tonneman, Lenie Gerrietsen, Jacoba Wijnands, Annie Ros, Anna Maria van Geene, Klara Post, Truida Heil-Bonnet, Dientje Meijer-Haantjes
 1952 — 14th place
Lenie Gerrietsen, Huiberdina Krul-van der Nolk van Gogh, Annie Ros, Tootje Selbach, Cootje van Kampen-Tonneman, Jo Cox-Ladru, Toetie Selbach, Nanny Simon
 1956 — did not participate
 1960 — 14th place
Bep van Ipenburg-Drommel, Lineke Majolee, Nel Fritz, Nel Wambach, Ria Meyburg, Ria van Velsen
 1964 — did not participate
 1968 — did not participate
 1972 — 9th place
Ans van Gerwen, Ans Dekker, Ikina Morsch, Nel van der Voort, Linda Toorop, Margo Velema
 1976 — 11th place
Ans Smulders, Jeannette van Ravestijn, Monique Bolleboom, Joke Kos, Ans Dekker, Carla Braan
 1980 through 2012 — did not participate
 2016 — 7th place
Eythora Thorsdottir, Céline van Gerner, Vera van Pol, Lieke Wevers, Sanne Wevers
 2020 — 11th place
Eythora Thorsdottir, Vera van Pol, Lieke Wevers, Sanne Wevers

World Championships
 2010 — 9th place
Céline van Gerner, Joy Goedkoop, Marlies Rijken, Suzanne Harmes, Sanne Wevers, Yvette Moshage
 2015 — 8th place
Eythora Thorsdottir, Lieke Wevers, Tisha Volleman, Sanne Wevers, Mara Titarsolej, Lisa Top
 2018 — 10th place
Kirsten Polderman, Vera van Pol, Naomi Visser, Tisha Volleman, Sanne Wevers
 2019 — 8th place
Eythora Thorsdottir, Naomi Visser, Tisha Volleman, Lieke Wevers, Sanne Wevers
 2022 — 9th place
 Eve de Ruiter, Eythora Thorsdottir, Sanna Veerman, Naomi Visser, Tisha Volleman

Most decorated gymnasts
This list includes all Dutch female artistic gymnasts who have won a medal at the Olympic Games or the World Artistic Gymnastics Championships.

See also 
 List of Olympic female artistic gymnasts for Netherlands

References

Gymnastics in the Netherlands
National women's artistic gymnastics teams
Women's national sports teams of the Netherlands